Nogometni klub Veržej, commonly referred to as NK Veržej or simply Veržej, is a Slovenian football club based in Veržej. The club was founded in 1963.

Honours
Slovenian Third League
Winners: 1992–93, 2012–13

MNZ Murska Sobota Cup
Winners: 2003–04, 2010–11, 2014–15

League history since 1991

References

External links
Official website 

Association football clubs established in 1963
Football clubs in Slovenia
1963 establishments in Slovenia